Regep Ağa  was an Ottoman general of Romanian origin (born circa 1770 – died October 1, 1814).

Early life 
Historical records indicate that Regep Ağa was born in the Rudăria area of Romania, in Almăj. There is no record of his exact date of birth, yet it is believed that he was born in 1770. Based on the publications of priest Coriolan Buracu, the Ottomans made incursions to Rudăria during the Austro-Turkish war of 1737-1739, taking families and children of Turks of Romania Ancestry back to their own lands. The Treaty of Sistova in 1791 practically put an end to the last incursions of the Ottoman in Almăj. Because of this, Regep Ağa was probably taken by the Ottomans and circumcised between 1737 and 1791. Researchers also believe that he was between 12 and 14 years old when he was taken by the Ottomans. Regep Ağa started his military career in the early 1800s.

Regep Ağa was Chiosa Mustafa Ağa's son and İbrahim Ağa's nephew. Both his Father and Uncle, ruled the city of Orșova and the surrounding area until 1788, as Ottoman vassals when the area was taken by the Austrians. Subsequently, the whole family, including Regep Ağa's father and three younger brothers (Adem, Bekir, and Salih), moved to Ada Kaleh (then also known as Orsova Nouva). Ada Kaleh became strategically important at that time and was called the Gibraltar of the Ottoman Empire. From then until 1816, Ada Kaleh was ruled by Regep Ağa and his family, after 1816 the whole Family and moved to Vidin and Russe. Regep Ağa was recognized by the authorities for his talents and abilities, and he developed good relations with Ismail Ağa (Bosneag, also cited in the literature as Smail-pasa), an Ottoman officer. Ismail Ağa took Regep Ağa under his wing and put him through high school, and eventually gave Regep Ağa  his daughter Durduca Hanım to be his wife. Durduca Hanım and Regep Ağa had a son named Rifat, who got a Khitan (circumcision) with great pomp, together with other boys from poor muslim Familiys.

Military career 
Regep Ağa began his military career sometime in the early 1800s when Ada Kaleh was under the rule of his uncle Ibrahim Ağa. In 1804, the First Serbian Uprising erupted in Belgrade. Regep Ağa received the news that the escaped dahiyas had fled by boat heading downstream on the Danube and had docked at Ada Kaleh. When Regep Ağa heard about the arrival of the dahiyas, he sent a message to Karađorđe. They agreed that Receb Ağa should approach the vizier Bekir Pasha to address the issue. To subdue the uprising, the vizier issued an order (katil-firman) to Ibrahim Ağa, ordering him to behead the dahiyas. Regep Ağa also wrote a separate letter to his uncle explaining the situation and asking him to proceed as instructed by executing the order. Milenko Stojković, the commander of the Pozarevac detachment, arrived in Orsova on July 25 at 6 AM and handed over the letters to Ibrahim Ağa. Ibrahim Ağa immediately gave the order and appointed 50 soldiers, including Milenko and 27 of his friends, who then executed the dahiyas.

Regep Ağa very quickly climbed the ladder of the military hierarchy, becoming a general, pasha of the third degree and commander of the fortress Ada Kaleh in 1806. Various documents record Receb Ağa's connections with important people of the time, such as Tudor Vladimirescu or Karađorđe, leader of the anti-Ottoman uprising of the Serbs between 1804 and 1813. Regep Ağa's actions at that time were very controversial, as alliances changed suddenly. Both good deeds as well as atrocities were committed.

During the war in 1813 waged by Serbs and Romanians from Timoc Valley and other parts of Serbia against the Ottomans, Regep Ağa participated in the battles to conquer the cities of Kladovo and Negotin. He was then the deputy to the grand vizier. Both cities fell into Ottoman hands again. A brutal massacre of civilians followed, including refugees from six neighbouring villages who were under the protection of Voivoda of Kladovo.

Having conquered Kladovo and Negotin, Receb Ağa expanded the territory under his rule to include the parts of south Banat in what is now Romania. As Vuk Karadžić wrote in the work Geographical-statistical description of Serbia, Kladovo and Negotin had since 1813 been subordinate to Ada Kaleh, who was then independent as a little Adakale Sultanligi. Some sources at that time even give Receb Ağa the title of "Prince" or even “King” of Ada Kaleh.

After the rebels' defeat, Regep Ağa helped the rebel leader Karađorđe to flee Serbia. Likewise, after the fall of the Negotin fortress, one of the outlaw leaders, Nicolae Abras, fled across the Danube and into the Almăj Mountains to hide, probably in territory where there were several groups of outlaws, as reported by the chronicler N. Stoica de Hateg. Here, he was caught by the Austrian authorities and handed over to the Ottomans, as S. I. Garleanu relates in his book "Outlawry and Outlaws":“Haiduc Velcu perishes cut off by the cannonball on July 20, 1813. The evacuation that followed because of the fierce attacks of Ottoman forces was successfully organized by Nicolae Abras, him being the last to leave the city. He had to escape to Banat. Not long after, the Austrian authorities extradite him to the Ottomans, and he sees himself in the hands of his ancestors’ enemy: Receb Ağa of Ada Kaleh. Receb Ağa condemns him to death by hanging but eventually releases him into Romania”.

Regep Ağa's military successes did not pass unnoticed by the other local pashas, which led to intrigues and conspiracies. Regep Ağa (now also a pasha and an Ottoman general) was not without ambitions himself. Some records indicate that he wanted the post of vizier of Belgrade pashalik. As a consequence he gained enemies, especially among other Ottoman generals who longed to take his place as the leader of Ada Kaleh. That is why Regep Ağa was arrested on charges of treason, allegedly for aiding Karađorđe in organizing the First Serbian Uprising. The pasha from Rusciuc even alluded to him being a christian and a traitor. In the end, the ambitions of the ruler of Ada Kaleh turned out to surpass his abilities. He failed to become a vizier in the pashalik of Belgrade, and was executed by the Ottoman authorities at Rusciuc on October 1, 1814. Following his death, his brothers took over leadership of Ada Kaleh, resisting the Ottomans and siding with Milosh Obrenovic in the Second Serbian Uprising. Their final defeat came in 1816 when they were expelled from Ada Kaleh.

Personal life 
Regebp Ağa lived in a large house on the island of Ada Kaleh. A group of professors and students from the Institute of Architecture in Bucharest went to Ada Kaleh between 1962 and 1965 when the issue of Ada Kaleh's submersion was raised, as a result of building the accumulation lake from the Iron Gates. They went to evaluate the architectural monuments on the island in order to prepare for the demolition of buildings and reconstruction at the planned relocation site.

One of the monuments that were planned to be moved to the island of Simian was Receb Ağa's house, built outside the fort, to the east near the Turkish cemetery, on the north bank of the Danube. It was a two-level brick and wood building, with a large kitchen, many bathrooms, airy verandas, and a Turkish bath. It was the largest house on the island. However, in 1971 the dam was complete, and the island disappeared under the waters of the reservoir. However, before the destruction, a team of scientists, led by C.S. Nicolaescu Plopsor, undertook a scientific research and rescue mission of all vestiges. From the island of Ada Kaleh, the fortifications, the mosque, the old cemetery, Regep Ağa's house, and the tomb of Miskin Baba were expected to be relocated. Only some of the architectural monuments from Ada Kaleh were relocated to the island of Simian under the leadership of C.S. Nicolaescu Plopsor. Because of his death, Regep-aga's house was not moved and ended up being engulfed by the waters of the reservoir. Due to its specific imperial-style architecture, the house became a tourist attraction known as Regep Ağa Pashalik house, as Receb Ağa's title Pasha became the family name of his descendants in Bosnia-Herzegovina (family Pasalic), some of whom lived in the house till the end. Now, nothing remains of the house except a few drawings, photos, and illustrations of it, such as the painting by Austrian painter Kanitz, held at the National Museum of Serbia, in Belgrade.

There was a church in the village of Tufari, near Orsova, where, at the foundation, he was painted together with one of his brothers, wearing a turban or fez. This was the only church in Romania where Ottomans were painted. The church and the village disappeared in the waters of the accumulation lake from the Iron Gates. The writings of Ilie Salceanu reveal that Regep Ağa supported many Romanians and Serbs in the area by giving them loans and protecting them when they were in danger. As an endowment, he gave them money in gold and all the necessary material for the construction of a holy church, which they built after his death in 1815. Until such time as the renovation of this church took place in 1911, an Ottoman with a fez on his head was depicted in the church vestibule. The inhabitants, who had forgotten the story, decided that the "Turk with fez" was pagan and that it should be removed from the holy church.

In an Ottoman magazine from the interwar period, it is stated: “he was very much respected by Emperor Francis I of Austria, whom in 1810 sent him a leading general with a special delegation". Also found from “Reproductions According to the Old Notes from the Various Church Books and Protocols of the Church of Mehadia” of the priest Coriolan Buracu, is further evidence of Regep Ağa's diplomatic skills when dealing with his Austrian counterparts. On this occasion, all conversation was in Romanian, as only Romanians represented both the Ottoman and Austrian sides.

References 

Pashas
1770 births
1814 deaths